Valeri Nikitin (born June 20, 1939 in Moscow, Russia – died January 13, 2002) was an ice hockey player who played in the Soviet Hockey League and National Hockey League.  He played for HC Khimik Voskresensk.  He was inducted into the Russian and Soviet Hockey Hall of Fame in 1967.

References

External links
 Russian and Soviet Hockey Hall of Fame bio

1939 births
2002 deaths
Soviet ice hockey players
Ice hockey people from Moscow
HC Khimik Voskresensk players
Russian ice hockey players